Henry Edward Cubitt, 4th Baron Ashcombe (31 March 1924 – 4 December 2013), was a British peer. He was the son of Roland Cubitt, 3rd Baron Ashcombe, and Sonia Rosemary Keppel, and the uncle and godfather of Queen Camilla.

Education and career 
Educated at Eton College, he served in the Royal Air Force during the Second World War. After the War he became chairman of Holland, Hannen & Cubitts, the family construction firm. He was the London-based Consul-General for Monaco from 1961 to 1968.

Family 
He was married three times without issue: 
  Ghislaine (née Dresselhuys) Countess of Caledon (ex-wife of Denis Alexander, 6th Earl of Caledon) was married to Lord Ashcombe from 1955 to 1968.  In 1972, she married Adrian Foley, 8th Baron Foley.
  Virginia Carington (daughter of Peter Carington, 6th Baron Carrington) was married to Lord Ashcombe from 1973 to 1979.  She is now a special aide to the Prince of Wales and the Duchess of Cornwall.
  Mary Elizabeth Chipps, the mother of two children from her previous marriage to the late Mark Dent-Brocklehurst, married Lord Ashcombe in 1979 at Sudeley Castle, which Lady Ashcombe partially owns with her children.  The medieval fortress, situated in the Cotswolds, is the home of Lady Ashcombe.

Lord Ashcombe's first cousin once removed, Mark Cubitt, born in 1964, is now the 5th Baron Ashcombe.

References

Sources
  The Peerage:  Henry Edward Cubitt, 4th Baron Ashcombe
  "More help for Charles and Camilla,"  The BBC, 23 November 2005

1924 births
2013 deaths
4
People educated at Eton College
Royal Air Force officers
Royal Air Force personnel of World War II
Henry
Henry
Henry
Ashcombe